Trabeculoplasty is a laser treatment for glaucoma. It is done on an argon laser equipped slit lamp, using a Goldmann gonioscope lens mirror. Specifically, an argon laser is used to improve drainage through the eye's trabecular meshwork, from which the aqueous humour drains. This helps reduce intraocular pressure caused by open-angle glaucoma.

Research 
The LiGHT trial compared the effectiveness of eye drops and selective laser trabeculoplasty for open angle glaucoma. Both contributed to a similar quality of life but most people undergoing laser treatment were able to stop using eye drops. Laser trabeculoplasty was also shown to be more cost-effective.

See also 
 Laser surgery
 Eye surgery
 Trabeculectomy

References 

Eye surgery